Tortugo (Spanish for turtle) is one of the 18 barrios in the municipality of San Juan, Puerto Rico. It is the third smallest barrio of San Juan in land area and had a population of 4,543 inhabitants in 2010.

Demographics
Of the 4,543 inhabitants, 67.6% were white, 19.63% were African-American, 0.42% were Amerindian, 0.15% were Asian, 8.3% were from other races and 3.9% were from a mixture of races. Of the total population, 99.32% identified as Hispanic or Latino descent.

See also
 List of communities in Puerto Rico

References

Barrios of San Juan, Puerto Rico